Mafang Area is an area and a town situated inside of Pinggu District, Beijing, China. It shares border with Machangying Town to the north, Donggaocun Town to the east, Nanniezhuang Village to the south, and Dasungezhuang Town to the west. It was home to 29,601 people as of 2020. 

This region had been a horse farm for military usage from Liao dynasty all the way to Qing dynasty, thus receiving its name Mafang.

History

Administrative divisions 
In the year 2021, Mafang Area comprised the following 26 subdivisions, where 4 were communities and 22 were villages:

See also 

 List of township-level divisions of Beijing

References 

Pinggu District
Towns in Beijing
Areas of Beijing